Dún Laoghaire is a parliamentary constituency represented in Dáil Éireann, the lower house of the Irish parliament or Oireachtas. The constituency elects 4 deputies (Teachtaí Dála, commonly known as TDs) on the system of proportional representation by means of the single transferable vote (PR-STV).

History and boundaries

The constituency was created in 1977, succeeding the earlier Dún Laoghaire and Rathdown constituency which had been created in 1948. The constituency is in the eastern coastal area of Dún Laoghaire–Rathdown county (part of County Dublin till 1994), including the town of Dún Laoghaire and the villages of Ballybrack, Blackrock, Booterstown, Cabinteely (east of the N11 road), Dalkey, Deansgrange, Glasthule, Killiney, Loughlinstown, Monkstown, Sallynoggin, Shankill, and Stillorgan. At the 2016 general election the constituency was redrawn to include the electoral divisions of Cabinteely-Loughlinstown, Foxrock-Carrickmines, Foxrock-Torquay and Stillorgan-Leopardstown from the now-dissolved Dublin South constituency.

TDs

Elections

2020 general election

2016 general election
Seán Barrett was Ceann Comhairle at the dissolution of the 31st Dáil and therefore deemed to be returned automatically. The constituency was treated as a three-seater for the purposes of calculating the quota.

2011 general election

2007 general election

2002 general election

1997 general election

1992 general election

1989 general election

1987 general election

November 1982 general election

February 1982 general election

1981 general election

1977 general election

See also
Elections in the Republic of Ireland
Politics of the Republic of Ireland
List of Dáil by-elections
List of political parties in the Republic of Ireland

References

External links
 Oireachtas Constituency Dashboards
 Oireachtas Members Database

Dáil constituencies
Parliamentary constituencies in County Dublin
Dún Laoghaire
Politics of Dún Laoghaire–Rathdown
1977 establishments in Ireland
Constituencies established in 1977